The Moschovakis coding lemma is a lemma from descriptive set theory involving sets of real numbers under the axiom of determinacy (the principle — incompatible with choice — that every two-player integer game is determined). The lemma was developed and named after the mathematician Yiannis N. Moschovakis.

The lemma may be expressed generally as follows:
Let  be such that . Then there is a -set  which is a choice set for R , that is: 

 .
 .
Easily,  must be a limit ordinal.

A winning strategy for I defines a  set  of reals encoding -choice sets for arbitrarily large . Define then 
,
which easily works. On the other hand, suppose  is a winning strategy for II.
.  
By the recursion theorem, there exists  such that .
, 
and 
. 
So let 
.

References 

Axioms of set theory
Determinacy
Large cardinals
Lemmas in set theory